Kevlar (para-aramid) is a strong, heat-resistant synthetic fiber, related to other aramids such as Nomex and Technora. Developed by Stephanie Kwolek at DuPont in 1965, the high-strength material was first used commercially in the early 1970s as a replacement for steel in racing tires. It is typically spun into ropes or fabric sheets that can be used as such, or as an ingredient in composite material components.

Kevlar has many applications, ranging from bicycle tires and racing sails to bulletproof vests, all due to its high tensile strength-to-weight ratio; by this measure it is five times stronger than steel. It is also used to make modern marching drumheads that withstand high impact; and for mooring lines and other underwater applications.

A similar fiber called Twaron with the same chemical structure was developed by Akzo in the 1970s; commercial production started in 1986, and Twaron is now manufactured by Teijin.

History 

Poly-paraphenylene terephthalamide (K29) – branded Kevlar – was invented by the American chemist Stephanie Kwolek while working for DuPont, in anticipation of a gasoline shortage. In 1964, her group began searching for a new lightweight strong fiber to use for light, but strong, tires. The polymers she had been working with at the time, poly-p-phenylene-terephthalate and polybenzamide, formed liquid crystals while in solution, something unique to those polymers at the time.

The solution was "cloudy, opalescent upon being stirred, and of low viscosity" and usually was thrown away. However, Kwolek persuaded the technician, Charles Smullen, who ran the spinneret, to test her solution, and was amazed to find that the fiber did not break, unlike nylon. Her supervisor and her laboratory director understood the significance of her discovery and a new field of polymer chemistry quickly arose. By 1971, modern Kevlar was introduced. However, Kwolek was not very involved in developing the applications of Kevlar. Kevlar 149 was invented by Dr. Jacob Lahijani of Dupont in the 1980s.

Production 

Kevlar is synthesized in solution from the monomers 1,4-phenylene-diamine (para-phenylenediamine) and terephthaloyl chloride in a condensation reaction yielding hydrochloric acid as a byproduct. The result has liquid-crystalline behavior, and mechanical drawing orients the polymer chains in the fiber's direction. Hexamethylphosphoramide (HMPA) was the solvent initially used for the polymerization, but for safety reasons, DuPont replaced it by a solution of N-methyl-pyrrolidone and calcium chloride. As this process had been patented by Akzo (see above) in the production of Twaron, a patent war ensued.

Kevlar production is expensive because of the difficulties arising from using concentrated sulfuric acid, needed to keep the water-insoluble polymer in solution during its synthesis and spinning.

Several grades of Kevlar are available:

 Kevlar K-29 – in industrial applications, such as cables, asbestos replacement, tires, and brake linings.
 Kevlar K49 – high modulus used in cable and rope products.
 Kevlar K100 – colored version of Kevlar
 Kevlar K119 – higher-elongation, flexible and more fatigue resistant
 Kevlar K129 – higher tenacity for ballistic applications
 Kevlar K149 – highest tenacity for ballistic, armor, and aerospace applications
 Kevlar AP – 15% higher tensile strength than K-29
 Kevlar XP – lighter weight resin and KM2 plus fiber combination
 Kevlar KM2 – enhanced ballistic resistance for armor applications

The ultraviolet component of sunlight degrades and decomposes Kevlar, a problem known as UV degradation, and so it is rarely used outdoors without protection against sunlight.

Structure and properties

The polymer owes its high strength to the many inter-chain bonds. These inter-molecular hydrogen bonds form between the carbonyl groups and NH centers. Additional strength is derived from aromatic stacking interactions between adjacent strands. These interactions have a greater influence on Kevlar than the van der Waals interactions and chain length that typically influence the properties of other synthetic polymers and fibers such as ultra-high-molecular-weight polyethylene. The presence of salts and certain other impurities, especially calcium, could interfere with the strand interactions and care is taken to avoid inclusion in its production. Kevlar's structure consists of relatively rigid molecules which tend to form mostly planar sheet-like structures rather like silk protein.

Thermal properties
Kevlar maintains its strength and resilience down to cryogenic temperatures: in fact, it is slightly stronger at low temperatures. At higher temperatures the tensile strength is immediately reduced by about 10–20%, and after some hours the strength progressively reduces further. For example: enduring  for 500 hours, its strength is reduced by about 10%; and enduring  for 70 hours, its strength is reduced by about 50%.

Applications

Science 

Kevlar is often used in the field of cryogenics for its low thermal conductivity and high strength relative to other materials for suspension purposes. It is most often used to suspend a paramagnetic salt enclosure from a superconducting magnet mandrel in order to minimize any heat leaks to the paramagnetic material. It is also used as a thermal standoff or structural support where low heat leaks are desired.

A thin Kevlar window has been used by the NA48 experiment at CERN to separate a vacuum vessel from a vessel at nearly atmospheric pressure, both  in diameter. The window has provided vacuum tightness combined with reasonably small amount of material (only 0.3% to 0.4% of radiation length).

Protection 

Kevlar is a well-known component of personal armor such as combat helmets, ballistic face masks, and ballistic vests. The PASGT helmet and vest used by United States military forces, use Kevlar as a key component in their construction. Other military uses include bulletproof face masks and spall liners used to protect the crews of armoured fighting vehicles. Nimitz-class aircraft carriers use Kevlar reinforcement in vital areas.  Civilian applications include: high heat resistance uniforms worn by firefighters, body armour worn by police officers, security, and police tactical teams such as SWAT.

Kevlar is used to manufacture gloves, sleeves, jackets, chaps and other articles of clothing designed to protect users from cuts, abrasions and heat.  Kevlar-based protective gear is often considerably lighter and thinner than equivalent gear made of more traditional materials.

It is used for motorcycle safety clothing, especially in the areas featuring padding such as the shoulders and elbows. In the sport of fencing it is used in the protective jackets, breeches, plastrons and the bib of the masks. It is increasingly being used in the peto, the padded covering which protects the picadors' horses in the bullring. Speed skaters also frequently wear an under-layer of Kevlar fabric to prevent potential wounds from skates in the event of a fall or collision.

Sport 
In kyudo, or Japanese archery, it may be used for bow strings, as an alternative to the more expensive hemp. It is one of the main materials used for paraglider suspension lines. It is used as an inner lining for some bicycle tires to prevent punctures. In table tennis, plies of Kevlar are added to custom ply blades, or paddles, in order to increase bounce and reduce weight. Tennis racquets are sometimes strung with Kevlar. It is used in sails for high performance racing boats.

In 2013, with advancements in technology, Nike used Kevlar in shoes for the first time. It launched the Elite II Series, with enhancements to its earlier version of basketball shoes by using Kevlar in the anterior as well as the shoe laces. This was done to decrease the elasticity of the tip of the shoe in contrast to the nylon conventionally used, as Kevlar expanded by about 1% against nylon which expanded by about 30%. Shoes in this range included LeBron, HyperDunk and Zoom Kobe VII. However these shoes were launched at a price range much higher than average cost of basketball shoes. It was also used in the laces for the Adidas F50 adiZero Prime football boot.

Several companies, including Continental AG, manufacture cycle tires with Kevlar to protect against punctures.

Folding-bead bicycle tires, introduced to cycling by Tom Ritchey in 1984, use Kevlar as a bead in place of steel for weight reduction and strength. A side effect of the folding bead is a reduction in shelf and floor space needed to display cycle tires in a retail environment, as they are folded and placed in small boxes.

Music 

Kevlar has also been found to have useful acoustic properties for loudspeaker cones, specifically for bass and mid range drive units. Additionally, Kevlar has been used as a strength member in fiber optic cables such as the ones used for audio data transmissions.

Kevlar can be used as an acoustic core on bows for string instruments. Kevlar's physical properties provide strength, flexibility, and stability for the bow's user. To date, the only manufacturer of this type of bow is CodaBow.

Kevlar is also presently used as a material for tailcords (a.k.a. tailpiece adjusters), which connect the tailpiece to the endpin of bowed string instruments.

Kevlar is sometimes used as a material on marching snare drums. It allows for an extremely high amount of tension, resulting in a cleaner sound. There is usually a resin poured onto the Kevlar to make the head airtight, and a nylon top layer to provide a flat striking surface. This is one of the primary types of marching snare drum heads. Remo's Falam Slam patch is made with Kevlar and is used to reinforce bass drum heads where the beater strikes.

Kevlar is used in the woodwind reeds of Fibracell. The material of these reeds is a composite of aerospace materials designed to duplicate the way nature constructs cane reed. Very stiff but sound absorbing Kevlar fibers are suspended in a lightweight resin formulation.

Motor vehicles

Kevlar is sometimes used in structural components of cars, especially high-value performance cars such as the Ferrari F40.

The chopped fiber has been used as a replacement for asbestos in brake pads. Aramids such as Kevlar release less airborne fibres than asbestos brakes and do not have the carcinogenic properties associated with asbestos.

Other uses 

Wicks for fire dancing props are made of composite materials with Kevlar in them. Kevlar by itself does not absorb fuel very well, so it is blended with other materials such as fiberglass or cotton. Kevlar's high heat resistance allows the wicks to be reused many times.

Kevlar is sometimes used as a substitute for Teflon in some non-stick frying pans.

Kevlar fiber is used in rope and in cable, where the fibers are kept parallel within a polyethylene sleeve. The cables have been used in suspension bridges such as the bridge at Aberfeldy, Scotland. They have also been used to stabilize cracking concrete cooling towers by circumferential application followed by tensioning to close the cracks. Kevlar is widely used as a protective outer sheath for optical fiber cable, as its strength protects the cable from damage and kinking. When used in this application it is commonly known by the trademarked name Parafil.

Kevlar was used by scientists at Georgia Institute of Technology as a base textile for an experiment in electricity-producing clothing. This was done by weaving zinc oxide nanowires into the fabric. If successful, the new fabric will generate about 80 milliwatts per square meter.

It was spectacularly unsuccessful, as it was completed 10 years late and replaced just 10 years later in May 1998 after a series of problems.

Kevlar can be found as a reinforcing layer in rubber bellows expansion joints and rubber hoses, for use in high temperature applications, and for its high strength. It is also found as a braid layer used on the outside of hose assemblies, to add protection against sharp objects.

Some cellphones (including the Motorola RAZR Family, the Motorola Droid Maxx, OnePlus 2 and Pocophone F1) have a Kevlar backplate, chosen over other materials such as carbon fiber due to its resilience and lack of interference with signal transmission.

The Kevlar fiber/epoxy matrix composite materials can be used in marine current turbines (MCT) or wind turbines due to their high specific strength and light weight compared to other fibers.

Composite materials
Aramid fibers are widely used for reinforcing composite materials, often in combination with carbon fiber and glass fiber. The matrix for high performance composites is usually epoxy resin. Typical applications include monocoque bodies for F1 racing cars, helicopter rotor blades, tennis, table tennis, badminton and squash rackets, kayaks, cricket bats, and field hockey, ice hockey and lacrosse sticks.

Kevlar 149, the strongest fiber and most crystalline in structure, is an alternative in certain parts of aircraft construction. The wing leading edge is one application, Kevlar being less prone than carbon or glass fiber to break in bird collisions.

See also
 Innegra S
 Ultra-high-molecular-weight polyethylene
 Twaron
 Vectran

References

External links

 
 Aramids
 Matweb material properties of Kevlar
 
 Kevlar 
 Kevlar in body armor
 Synthesis of Kevlar
 Aberfeldy Footbridge over the River Tay
 Kevlar at Plastics Wiki

Organic polymers
Body armor
DuPont products
Synthetic fibers
Technical fabrics
Brand name materials
Products introduced in 1965
American inventions